The 1960 Davidson Wildcats football team represented Davidson College as a member of the Southern Conference (SoCon) during the 1960 NCAA University Division football season. Led by ninth-year head coach Bill Dole, the Wildcats compiled an overall record of 3–5 with a mark of 1–3 in conference play, placing seventh in the SoCon.

Schedule

References

Davidson
Davidson Wildcats football seasons
Davidson Wildcats football